Still Bill is the second studio album by American soul singer-songwriter and producer Bill Withers, released in 1972 by Sussex Records. The album was recorded and produced by Withers with musicians from the Watts 103rd Street Rhythm Band. The rhythmic music produced for the record features soul, funk, and blues sounds, backing lyrics that explore themes of human nature, emotion, and sex from a middle-class male perspective. It also features some of Withers' most popular songs, including the hit singles "Lean on Me" and "Use Me". A commercial and critical success at the time of its release, Still Bill has since been regarded by music journalists as a highlight of the singer's recording career and a classic of 1970s R&B.

Reception 
Still Bill was met with positive reviews. Writing for Rolling Stone in 1972, Vince Aletti regarded it as an improvement over Withers' debut album Just as I Am, particularly because of the singer's production, which sustains even the less exceptional songs here. "On the whole", Aletti claimed, "it's a tougher, more relaxed, more assured album ... Nothing is thrown away, everything works with an unexpected clarity and strength." Billboard hailed Still Bill as justification for the critical hype surrounding his debut and live performances, while observing "plenty of sunshine" in the music, highlighting "Lean on Me", "Who is He (And What Is He to You)", "Kissing My Love", and "Lonely Town, Lonely Street". Reviewing in Creem, Robert Christgau gave the record a B-plus and said, "Withers has created the most credible persona of any of the new middle-class male soul singers, avoiding Marvin Gaye's occasional vapidity, Donny Hathaway's overkill, and Curtis Mayfield's blackness-mongering. He sounds straight, strong, compassionate. This album moves out rhythmically, too". However, the critic concluded with reservations about its "missing some essential excitement".

Commercially, Still Bill produced two hit singles: "Lean on Me" (number one on both the Billboard pop and R&B charts in mid 1972) and "Use Me" (number two on the same charts later that year). On September 7, 1972, the album was certified gold by the Recording Industry Association of America (RIAA), having recorded at least 500,000 copies sold.

Reappraisal and legacy 

Retrospective appraisals have also been positive. Reviewing years later in Christgau's Record Guide: Rock Albums of the Seventies (1981), Christgau expressed more enthusiasm about Still Bill, saying that Withers is "also plenty raunchy and he can rock dead out". He went on to write that the "self-production here is adamantly spare, with Ray Jackson furnishing the hook of the year on 'Use Me,' one of the few knowledgeable songs about sex our supposedly sexy music has ever produced". PopMatters critic Andy Hermann wrote a review in anticipation of the album's CD reissue by Columbia Records in 2003, calling it "essential listening for any fan of early '70s funk and R&B". Hermann also highlighted the contributions of session musicians from the Watts 103rd Street Rhythm Band, crediting them for having helped Withers develop "a unique style of bluesy funk that was the perfect soundtrack to the emotional drama [that] leaked out from around the corners of Withers' laid-back West Virginia drawl". Writing in 2005, David Wild of Rolling Stone found the album "finer and funkier" than Just as I Am and "still a stone-soul masterpiece", while Stylus Magazines Derek Miller called it "a stone-cold, gold-plated soul classic ... far and away Withers' best", and more than comparable to enduring LPs from the same period, such as Isaac Hayes' Hot Buttered Soul (1969), Mayfield's Roots (1971), Stevie Wonder's Talking Book (1972), and Al Green's Call Me (1973). Miller added that Still bill exemplified Withers' musical daring, having fused soul, blues, and "muscular funk" into a sound that finds "form between the lines … bound by the heated muscle of its rhythms and the satin berth of its softer moments".

In 2007, Still Bill was included in The Guardians list of "1,000 albums to hear before you die", with an accompanying essay that said the album "contains two of [Withers'] most epochal and best-loved compositions 'Lean on Me' and 'Who Is He (And What Is He to You)?' but [that] the blend of patient, understated, insistently funky acoustic playing is just as vital". Tom Moon included it in a similar publication, 1,000 Recordings to Hear Before You Die (2008), citing the album as "one of the most eloquent records" in rhythm and blues. "These are shades-of-gray stories, full of a mature understanding of human nature", Moon observed, before concluding that, "even when reflecting on weighty matters, Withers cultivates a mood of unflappable calm, making everything sound like a lazy summer evening on the front porch."  In 2020, Still Bill ranked number 333 on Rolling Stones revised edition of the "500 Greatest Albums of All Time" list.

Track listing

Personnel
 Bill Withers – vocals, guitar, acoustic piano (5), acoustic guitar (11, 12)
 Ray Jackson – acoustic piano, clavinet, Wurlitzer electric piano, horn and string arrangements
 Benorce Blackmon – guitar
 Melvin Dunlap – bass guitar
 James Gadson – drums, percussion
 Bobbye Hall – percussion (11, 12)

Production
 Bill Withers – producer (1-12)
 Ray Jackson – producer (1-12)
 Benorce Blackmon – producer (1-10)
 Melvin Dunlap – producer (1-10)
 James Gadson – producer (1-10)
 Bob Hughes – engineer
 Phil Schier – engineer, remixing 
 Michael Mendel – art direction 
 Maurer Productions – art direction
 Milton Sincoff – package design 
 Hal Wilson – photography 
2003 Reissue Credits
 Leo Sacks – producer 
 Steve Berkowitz – A&R
 Darren Salmieri – A&R coordinator 
 Joseph M. Palmaccio – mastering
 Lisa Buckler – product manager
 Maurice Joshua – product manager
 Triana D'Orazio – packaging manager
 Howard Fritzon – art direction
 Tim Morse – design 
 Harry Goodwin – photography
 Bob Gruen – photography
 Michael Ochs Archive – photography
 SMP/Globe Photos – photography
 Bill Withers – liner notes 
Studios
 Recorded at The Record Plant (Los Angeles, California).
 Bonus Tracks recorded live at Carnegie Hall (New York City, New York).
 2003 reissue mastered at Sony Music Studios (New York City, New York).

Charts

See also
List of number-one R&B albums of 1972 (U.S.)

References

External links

1972 albums
Bill Withers albums
Sussex Records albums